Beginning in 2019, streaming service Hulu began to produce its own original films. Its first film was Batman & Bill, a documentary about comic book writer Bill Finger. Its first narrative feature film was Little Monsters, an independently produced zombie comedy film.

Original films

Feature films

Documentaries

Specials
These programs are one-time events or supplementary content related to original films.

Co-distributed films
These films premiered in theatres, but were co-distributed on Hulu when they received wide releases.

Upcoming original films

Feature films

Documentaries

Exclusive international distribution

Hotstar 
Disney announced that Hotstar will no longer be available in the United States in late 2022 and integrate into Hulu instead.

Notes

References

External links
 

Internet-related lists